Nicholas Joseph Whelan (December 1869 – April 9, 1952) was the Speaker of the Michigan House of Representatives from 1907 to 1908.

Early life
Whelan was born in December 1869 Muskegon County, Michigan.

Career
Whelan was admitted to the bar in 1895. Whelan served as a member of the Michigan House of Representatives from the Ottawa County 1st district from January 8, 1903 to 1908. In his last term, he served as Speaker of the Michigan House of Representatives. Whelan was a Republican.

Personal life
Whelan married Jeanne Blom in 1904.

Death
Whelan died on April 9, 1952.

References

1869 births
People from Muskegon County, Michigan
Speakers of the Michigan House of Representatives
Republican Party members of the Michigan House of Representatives
20th-century American politicians
1952 deaths